Craighall Park is a suburb of Johannesburg, South Africa. It is located in Region B of the City of Johannesburg Metropolitan Municipality. Residents of the suburb are represented by the CraigPark Residents Association.

References

Johannesburg Region B